The  is the police academy of the Tokyo Metropolitan Police Department, located in Fuchū, Tokyo. Its construction was completed in August 2002.

History
The 14-story facility was completed in August 2002. It features an indoor swimming pool and modern dormitories where students are required to reside.

The academy hosted an open house event for the first time in March 2015, offering private seminars, fingerprint collecting and other activities in the hopes of combatting a recent decline of applications.

Examinations

Upon acceptance recruits are enrolled in a training course involving "physical strength, vitality and character building." After completing this training recruits move on to the main curriculum. Graduates of high school, junior colleges, or universities are all welcome to apply; however, university graduates are given a training course of only six months, while high school students and junior college students are trained for ten months.

Curriculum

The curriculum includes both general education subjects such as ethics and courses geared for police work such as laws, martial arts such as kendo and judo, and shooting firearms.

Specialized courses offered at the academy include:

Criminal investigation/identification
International organized crime control
Community safety investigation
Cybercrime investigation
Traffic investigation
Crime victim assistance
Patrol car officer
Police motorcycle officer
SP (Security Police)
Judo and Kendo instructor training
Sign language

There are also courses available for study overseas or other non-academy locations, such as:

Computer technology
Diving training
Automobile mechanic
Motorboat operation
Aircraft maintenance
Police dog training
Foreign languages (Including English, Mandarin, Korean, Persian, Tagalog, and Spanish)
Bookkeeping
First aid

Student life

"The trainees....lead an orderly life at this institute by precisely following daily routines." There are various club activities offered in their down time.

References

External links
 Official Site

Japan
Education in Tokyo
Tokyo Metropolitan Police Department